, real name  (born September 22, 1952 in Yokohama, Kanagawa) is a Japanese actress.

Roles
 Sachiko Yagami in Death Note

References
 

1952 births
Living people
Actresses from Yokohama
20th-century Japanese actresses